Witkowice  is a village in the administrative district of Gmina Młodzieszyn, within Sochaczew County, Masovian Voivodeship, in east-central Poland.

The village has an approximate population of 500.

References

Witkowice